Pakistan Music Stars, a music reality show which is a production of ARY Digital Network is currently on-air on ARY Digital on every Sunday at 9:00PM (Pakistan Standard Time). A total number of 19 episode are announced of this show. The 1st episode of this was the launch of this show while episodes 17th & 18th are semi-finals. The 19th and last episode is the grand finale of the show.

Pakistan Music Stars